The Minister of the Interior (before 2013 sisäasiainministeri) is one of the ministerial portfolios in the Finnish Government. The Minister of the Interior is in charge of the Ministry of the Interior.

The incumbent Marin Cabinet's Minister of the Interior is Krista Mikkonen of the Green League.

List of Ministers of the Interior

References

Ministry of the Interior of Finland
Interior